Rew Street is a village on the Isle of Wight. It is located three kilometres southwest of Cowes in the north of the island. The village lies along the main road between Porchfield and Gurnard (where the  2011 Census population was included) and consists of several farming communities. As a result, many of the houses in the area have been converted from old barns.

References

Villages on the Isle of Wight